Epiphania or Epiphaneia was a city in Bithynia in Anatolia mentioned by Stephanus of Byzantium.

Its site is unlocated.

References

Populated places in Bithynia
Former populated places in Turkey
Lost ancient cities and towns